Preludes is a Canadian short film series, which premiered in 2000. Commissioned by the Toronto International Film Festival to mark the event's 25th anniversary in 2000, the series consisted of ten short films by Canadian directors which were inspired in some way by the festival, and each film screened as a prelude to a feature film in the 2000 Toronto International Film Festival program.

The most successful film in the series was Guy Maddin's The Heart of the World, which won numerous awards including the Genie Award for Best Live Action Short Film at the 22nd Genie Awards. David Cronenberg's entry, Camera, was also a Genie nominee in the same category.

The full Preludes program was subsequently screened on the web, on a platform funded by Bell Canada.

Films

References

Canadian film series
2000 in Canadian cinema
Toronto International Film Festival
English-language Canadian films
Film series introduced in 2000